Elm Creek is a stream in Fall River and Custer counties, South Dakota, in the United States. It is a tributary of the Cheyenne River.

Elm Creek was named for the elm trees along its banks.

See also
List of rivers of South Dakota

References

Rivers of Custer County, South Dakota
Rivers of Fall River County, South Dakota
Rivers of South Dakota